Chronovski was formed in Singapore in 2003 to create a class of affordable crystal watches. Chronovski  was positioned as a name synonymous with exquisite affordably priced timepieces, manufactured under the highest standards of quality and design.

At that time, the watch market was dominated by bling culture, facilitated by 3 trends.

 The hip-hop culture led by rapstars such as Beyoncé, Eminem and Jay-Z.
 The rightist/conservative movement towards bling culture where consumers styled themselves like monarchs decked in diamonds.
 A mass market movement to diamond watches as a way to portray affluence.

Sensing that the market was in need of a quality quartz watch brand that could cater to the mass market, Chronovski proceeded to launch sub $100–200 crystal encrusted watches.  "In an attempt to make time-reading exciting again, Chronovski watches often came with flashy and glittery designs.

In the years 2004 to 2010, Chronovski managed to distribute half a million pieces of watches and ride on the bling culture. Norway was the largest market, followed by USA, Sweden, Denmark, UK and Australia.

2008's Lehman Bros collapse decimated the bling-bling trend. What was seen as opulent excesses of Wall Street was frowned upon and the fashion trend shifted away from bling culture.

Most importantly, the rise of smartphones and its replacement of watches as time-keeping devices hit Chronovski badly in the early 2010s.

In 2012, the legacy of watch-making came to an end for the company when Chronovski diversified into a digital lifestyle fashion brand.

References

External links
Chronovski official homepage

Manufacturing companies established in 1932
Czech brands
Watch brands
1932 establishments in Czechoslovakia